The James W. Foley House on 6th St. in Bismarck, North Dakota, United States, was built in 1907.  It was listed on the National Register of Historic Places (NRHP) in 1977 but was delisted in 1994, when it was relocated to the Missouri Valley Fairgrounds.  It has also been known as the Elan Art Gallery.

References

Houses on the National Register of Historic Places in North Dakota
Houses completed in 1907
Houses in Bismarck, North Dakota
Former National Register of Historic Places in North Dakota
National Register of Historic Places in Bismarck, North Dakota